Ibrahim Ahmed Abdelwareth (born 16 December 1988) is an Egyptian track and field athlete who competes in the F44 classification, mainly in throwing events. Abdelwareth represented Egypt at the 2012 Summer Paralympics in London, where he entered both the discus and shot put in the F37/F38. He finished eighth in the discus, but found success in the shot put where a throw of 15.53 gave him the silver medal. Abdelwareth has also found success at the World Championships winning gold in the 2011 IPC Athletics World Championships in Christchurch. As of 2013, Abdelwareth was reclassified as a T44 athlete, where he has found it difficult to repeat his earlier success.

References 

1988 births
Living people
Egyptian male shot putters
Egyptian male discus throwers
Paralympic athletes of Egypt
Athletes (track and field) at the 2012 Summer Paralympics
Paralympic silver medalists for Egypt
Medalists at the 2012 Summer Paralympics
Paralympic medalists in athletics (track and field)